Leo Zeff (May 14, 1912 - April 13, 1988) was an American psychologist and psychotherapist in Oakland, California who pioneered the use of LSD, ecstasy (MDMA), and other psychoactive drugs in psychotherapy in the 1970s.

In 1977, when Alexander Shulgin introduced Zeff to MDMA, the drug was still legal. Zeff popularized it in the psychotherapeutic community, dubbing it "Adam" because he believed it returned one to a state of primordial innocence.

Leo Zeff was introduced to LSD in 1961 when he was working as a Jungian therapist, and he developed a method for administering LSD to patients during psychotherapy. Working with carefully screened patients only, the major aim of the first (and possibly only) session involved finding the patient's correct LSD dose. The patient underwent the early part of the experience wearing an eye mask whilst listening to music. Zeff being available to give emotional support if needed. If the experiences became difficult, Zeff recommended facing it and going with it. In later parts of the experience, patients looked at photographs of family members and themselves.

Prior to working with psychedelics, Leo Zeff had been a lieutenant colonel in the US Army.

See also
Claudio Naranjo

References

External links
The Secret Chief Revealed: Conversations with Leo Zeff, Pioneer in the Underground Psychedelic Therapy Movement by Myron J. Stolaroff, Multidisciplinary Association for Psychedelic Studies (2004, 1997) 
Zeff Memorial Library, A Selection of Books, Anthologies, Papers, and Newsletters about Entheogens, Council on Spiritual Practices
Zeff, Leo | Purdue University Libraries, Archives and Special Collections

Psychedelic drug researchers
20th-century American psychologists
American psychedelic drug advocates
1912 births
1988 deaths